The Great Mother: An Analysis of the Archetype is a book discussing mother goddesses by the psychologist Erich Neumann. The dedication reads, "To C. G. Jung friend and master in his eightieth year". Although Neumann completed the German manuscript in Israel in 1951, The Great Mother was first published in English in 1955. The work has been seen as an enduring contribution to the literature inspired by Jung, and was the first to analyze an archetype with such depth and scope.

Summary

Great Round of female archetypes

An abbreviated abstract of Neumann's diagram, identified as "Schema III", will here introduce the book's narrative and analysis. At the rim of the circle, or Great Round, are situated several mother goddesses and related female entities drawn from the history of religions. To represent a typology, Neumann selected six representatives.

                                           Mary
 
                                Isis                 Sophia

                                            X

                               Lilith                 Kali

                                       the witches

These figures are grouped in two polar opposites: the Mother axis (Isis-Kali); the Anima axis (Sophia-Lilith); the two axes intersect in the center of the circle, forming a large X (shown here reduced in size). The lower quadrant is considered negative, with both Lilith and Kali being half positive and half negative. A vertical connecting the 'archetypal Feminine' (Mary-the witches) is mentioned. 

Neumann in his Schema III drew upon the values of traditional cultures, with a strong caveat: the Round here is 'reductionist', a simplification for brevity and clarity; in analytically positioning these figures of the psyche, each is ambivalent. In human nature of each individual, these symbolic figures possess great power, dynamic and polyvalent, in potential or as activated. Further, depending on the context, each archetypal figures may "shift" or "reverse" into its opposite. The two dimensional diagram is, accordingly, actually three. Schema III:

Kali, the terrible Mother (sickness, dismemberment, death, extinction); and the Gorgon. 
the witches, negative change, as in a fairy-tale witch; also: the Furies.
Lilith, the negative Anima (ecstasy, madness, impotence, stupor); and Circe. 
Isis, the good Mother (fruit, birth, rebirth, immortality); also: Demeter and Ishtar (Inanna).
Mary (spiritual transformation); also: Kwan-Yin (Avalokiteśvara).
Sophia, the positive Anima (wisdom, vision, inspiration, ecstasy), the Muse; also: Maat. 

These female figures are not of precise attributes, nor rigid, fixed characteristics, but are changeable, as explained both objectively by religious history, and subjectively by archetypal psychology. Hence, there is overlap in the Great Round positions.

Archetypal articulation and consciousness
Following the theme of his The Origins and History of Consciousness (1949; 1954), Neumann first tracks the evolution of feminine archetypes from the original uroboros (primordial unconsciousness). These archetypes become articulated from the "Great Round". "The psychological development [of humankind]... begins with the 'matriarchal' stage in which the archetype of the Great Mother dominates and the unconscious directs the psychic process of the individual and the group." Eventually, from the symbolic Great Round, new psychic constellations are articulated, e.g., the Eleusinian Mysteries.

Increasingly, opportunities opened in these ancient cultures for spiritual transformation which liberated the individual ego consciousness, the awareness of self. The "rise to consciousness" through a semi-unconscious social process affecting the group becomes institutionalized as ritual. Later more individual paths may evolve to augment this process.

Cultural, academic issues

Psychology of gender dichotomy
In Neumann's prior work The Origins and History of Consciousness, the Great Mother archetype is eventually transcended by the mythic Hero. His victory personifies the emergence of a well-established ego consciousness from the prior sway of unconscious or semi-conscious forces (characterized by female symbolism). The gender-dichotomy framework, however, favored a focus on the liberation of male consciousness.

In his subsequent The Great Mother, Neumann directs most of his attention to the feminine archetypes, elaborating their nature and qualities. Its seldom-stated back story, by default, is the emergence of the ego consciousness of the male hero. Yet the book closes with a brief summary of the "primordial mysteries of the Feminine", including the Eleusinian of the mother and daughter Demeter and Persephone, and the transformative figure of wisdom, Sophia. "Neumann was well aware that The Great Mother [emphasized] only one side of the story, and had plans to complement the study with a volume on the female psychology of the Great Mother." His early death foreclosed such a companion volume.

Neumann did publish several articles, followed by an amplification of it, which outlined his multilateral understanding of the rise of a woman's ego consciousness and corresponding relationship to the Great Mother archetype. Other Jungian studies, however, have addressed analogous paths of female consciousness.

Archetype compared to archaeology
Neumann praised Johann Jakob Bachofen in a 1930s manuscript, latter published, calling Bachofen "a treasure chest of psychological knowledge" if "interpreted symbolically and not historically". His book, highly influential in its era: Das Mutterrecht (1861) [Mother Right: an investigation of the religious and juridical character of matriarchy in the Ancient World]. Yet Bachofen's theory of "female dominated epochs" did not survive scrutiny; it had been "criticised and rejected by most contemporary historians". Neumann, following the subsequent scholarship, viewed Bachofen not as a cultural historian of an ancient matriarchy, but rather as a great modern researcher of the soul. 

While conceding the negative conclusions of cultural history and archaeology, in the 1930s there was an effort "to rescue Bachofen's concept of an age of gynaecocracy through a psychological revision." Starting from a piece by Jung on the mother archetype, Neumann slowly "expanded Jung's original research", broadening its range and adding depth. A large number of Eranos illustrations depicting historic Female Archetypes supplemented his text. He finished the manuscript in 1951, Die Grosse Mutter. Liebscher cautions that it is "important today to read Neumann's study not as a contribution to a failed ancient cult of the Goddess but as an exemplary study of archetypal psychology."

Several decades later, Marija Gimbutas in her 1989 book presented ancient evidence to support a widespread cult of the Great Mother Goddess. The book drew a strong popular response. It spawned renewed interest in this complex theory studied by multiple academic disciplines, and written about by generalists. Yet this theory was considered suspect by 'New Archeology'. Admittedly, there were many specific goddesses in the ancient world, some with very large followings. Yet Liebsher notes "most archaeological scholars today agree that there is no evidence for ancient worship of the Great Mother goddess... ." Another opinion holds that Gimbutas has been recently "vindicated". 

Until his untimely death, Neumann continued to publish on feminine psychology. Inclusive of new research and debate, many adherents persist in taking the view of a privileged cultural role for ancient women, and often favor a transformation in gender understanding.

Reception

Psychologist James Hillman criticizes Neumann's reductionism in interpreting every kind of female figure and image as a symbol of the Great Mother. Hillman suggests that, "If one's research shows results of this kind, i.e., where all data indicate one dominant hypothesis, then it is time to ask a psychological question about the hypothesis."

Jungian analyst Robert H. Hopcke, who calls The Great Mother "monumental in its breadth", considers it "Neumann's most enduring contribution to Jungian thought" alongside The Origins and History of Consciousness (1949).

Archaeologist Marija Gimbutas "much appreciated" Neumann's book. His "psychological approach has opened new avenues in the interpretation... of the prehistoric Goddess." Yet Prof. Gimbutas felt that "the term mother devalues her importance and does not allow appreciation of her total character. Further, much of Neumann's archetype is based on post-Indo-European religious ideology, after the image of the Goddess had suffered a profound and largely debased transformation." Accordingly, for the prehistoric period, Gimbutas preferred "the term Great Goddess as best describing her absolute rule, her creative, destructive, and regenerative powers."

Siegmund Hurwitz, among other references to Neumann, quotes approvingly from The Great Mother for Neumann's description and characterization of the "anima figure" as a distinct female archetype, to be distinguished from the originally more powerful mother type.

Scholar Camille Paglia identifies The Great Mother as an influence on her work of literary criticism Sexual Personae (1990). She has called it "a visual feast" and his "most renowned" work.

Scholar Martin Liebscher writes, "Neumann's The Great Mother provided a watershed moment in the way archetypal studies would be conducted." The many previous monographs focused on a particular archetype could not compete "with the minute detail and careful structuring of Neumann's examination of the Great Mother archetype."

References

Bibliography
Books

 Bachofen, Johann Jakob ([1861], 1967), Myth, Religion, and Mother Right. Selected writings. Bollingen, Princeton University.
 Frey-Rohn, Liliane ([1969], 1974), From Freud to Jung. A comparative study. Jung Foundation, Putnam, New York.
 Gimbutas, Marija (1989), The Language of the Goddess. Harper and Row, New York.
 Graeber, David, and Wengrow, David (2021), The Dawn of Everything. A new history of humanity. Farrar, Straus & Giroux, New York.
 Harding, M. Esther (1936, 1955), Woman's Mysteries. Ancient and modern. Longmans, Green, London; rev'd ed., Pantheon, New York; several reprints.
 
 
 Hurwitz, Siegmund (1992), Lilith the first Eve. Historical and psychological aspects of the dark feminine. Daimon Verlag, Einsiedeln.
 Jung, Carl (1912, 4th rev'd 1950; 1956, 1967), Symbols of Transformation. Bollingen, Princeton University, CW, v.5.
 Jung, Carl (1921; 1971), Psychological Types. Bollingen, Princeton University, CW, v.6.
 Jung/Neumann (2015), Analytical Psychology in Exile. The correspondence of C. G. Jung and Erich Neumann. Princeton University. Edited by Martin Liebscher.
 Monick, Eugene (1987), Phallos. Sacred image of the masculine. Inner City, Toronto. 
 Neumann, Erich ([1940]; 2019), The Roots of Jewish Consciousness. v.1, Revelation and apocalypse. Routeledge, London.
 Neumann, Erich (1949; 1954), The Origins and History of Consciousness. Bollingen, Pantheon; foreword by Carl Jung. 
 Neumann, Erich ([1951], 1955, 2d ed. 1963; 1991, 2015), The Great Mother.  Bollingen, Princeton University Press 
 Neumann, Erich (1952; 1956), Amor and Psyche. The Psychic development of the Feminine: A commentary on the tale by Apuleius. Harper; Bollingen.
 Neumann, Erich ([1950s]; 1994), The Fear of the Feminine, Princeton University (collection of essays). 
 
 Perera, Sylvia Brinton (1981), Descent to the Goddess. A way of initiation for women. Inner City, Toronto.
 Qualls-Corbett, Nancy (1988), The Sacred Prostitute. Eternal aspect of the feminine. Inner City, Toronto.
 Rowland, Susan (2002), Jung. A Feminist Revision. Polity, Cambridge.
 Whitmont, Edward C. (1982), Return of the Goddess. Crossroad, New York.
 Goodison, Lucy, and Christine Morris, eds. (1999), Ancient Goddesses. The myths and the evidence. University of Wisconsin & British Museum.
 Olson, Carl, editor (1992), The Book of the Goddess. Past and Present. Crossroad, New York.

Articles
 Douglas, Claire (2008), "The historical context of analytical psychology" in The Cambridge Companion to Jung.
 Goodison, Lucy, and Christine Morris (1999), "Introduction. Exploring Female Divinity: From modern myths to ancient evidence", in Goodison and Morris.
 Jung, Carl (1938, 1954; 1959, 1969), "Psychological aspects of the Mother Archetype" in Archetypes and the Collective Unconscious. Bollingen, CW, v.9i.
 Liebscher, Martin (2015), "Forward" to Neumann's The Great Mother, Princeton Classics Edition. 
 Neumann, Erich (1950), "Towards a Psychology of the Feminine in the Patriarchy" in Jahresbericht, Psychological Club, Zurich.
 Neumann, Erich (1950; 1954; 1994), "The Moon and Matriarchal Consciousness" in Fear (1994); a different translation in Spring (1954).
 Neumann, Erich (1953; 1959; 1994), "Psychological Stages of Woman's Development" in Fear (1994); a different translation in Spring (1959).
 Neumann, Erich (1954; 1959), "Leonardo da Vinci and the Mother Archetype" in Art and the Creative Unconsciousness, Bollingen, Princeton University.
 Neumann, Erich (1956; 1979), "Freud and the father image" in Creative Man. Five essays, Bollingen, Princeton.
 Neumann, Erich (1959; 1986; 1994), "The Fear of the Feminine" in Fear (1994); a different translation in Quadrant (1986).
 Paglia, Camille (Winter 2006), "Erich Neumann: Theorist of the Great Mother", in Arion 13/3, pp. 1–14.
 Spretnak, Charlene (2011), "Anatomy of a backlash: concerning the work of Marija Gimbutas" in Journal of Archaeomythology 7: 25-51.
 Tringham, Ruth, and Margaret Conkey (1999), "Rethinking the Figurines. A critical view from archaeology of Gimbutas, the 'Goddess' and popular culture", in Goodison and Morris, editors.

1955 non-fiction books
Books by Erich Neumann
German non-fiction books
Princeton University Press books
Books about paganism